Shepherd Mountain is a summit in Iron County in the U.S. state of Missouri.  Shepherd Mountain lies just west of Ironton and Stouts Creek in the Arcadia Valley.

Shepherd Mountain has the name of Forrest Shepherd, a geologist. The mountain was the scene of action during the Battle of Fort Davidson.

References

Mountains of Iron County, Missouri
Mountains of Missouri